The Khao Manee cat (lit. "white jewel"), or Khao Plort (lit. "complete white"), also known as the Diamond Eye cat, is a rare breed of cat originating in Thailand, which has an ancient ancestry tracing back hundreds of years. They are mentioned in the Tamra Maew, or Cat Book Poems. Khao Manee cats are pure white with a short, smooth, close-lying coat. They can have blue eyes, gold eyes or odd-eyes with one of each colour. The odd-eyed Khao Manee is the rarest variety. They are muscular, athletic cats of moderate foreign type and are reputed to be active, communicative and intelligent.

Although the breed is well known in its native land it has only recently been adopted by Western cat breeders, gaining "registration only" status from TICA in May 2009. On 3 September 2011, the breed was promoted to "Preliminary New Breed", effective from 1 May 2012, and on 30 August 2013 the breed was promoted to "Advanced New Breed", effective immediately.

On January 24, 2015, the Khao Manee breed was advanced to Championship level in TICA, effective May 1, 2015.

On 8 September 2010, at the meeting of the GCCF Executive Committee, the Khao Manee was granted breed name in GCCF, and was approved for exhibition only. The Khao Manee Cat Club was granted GCCF pre-affiliation at the Council meeting on 26 October 2011.

The breed has now gained acceptance also in CFA on February 7, 2018, and has been welcome in their shows from May 1, 2018. The CFA is the World Largest Registry of Pedigreed Cats and this new achievement is placing now the breed as globally recognized.

History

The Khao Manee is an ancient cat breed comparable to the Siamese, Korat and other Thailand cat breeds.  The Khao Manee is mentioned in the Tamra Maew, or Cat Book Poems, that also mention the Siamese cat breed and other coat colored cats endemic to the country Thailand, or Siam, as it was previously known. 
 Khao Manee cats are pure white with a short, smooth, close-lying coat.

Ayutthaya Kingdom
In the Ayutthaya Kingdom (AD 1351-1767) there are many books about ancient Siam cats recording cats such as the Siamese cat, Korat cat, Suphalak cat, Konja cat, etc.. There are 23 species in Ayutthaya. 17 species were fed at the Ayutthaya royal palace, but there are no records about the Khao Manee. There are a few records about white cats, but no specific records about the Khao Manee. Only 23 species have been recorded.

Thonburi Kingdom

After the Ayutthaya Kingdom collapsed during the Burmese-Siamese War (AD 1765-67), the Siamese people emigrated to the Thonburi kingdom (AD 1768-1782). One of the most important temples in Bangkok is in the Wat Arun. A Buddhist temple had existed at the site of Wat Arun since the time of the Ayutthaya Kingdom. When King Taksin established his new capital of Thonburi near the temple after the fall of Ayutthaya, the Khao Manee's historical records were found there.

Rattanakosin Kingdom (Bangkok)

In the reign of King Nangklao (AD 1824-1851), the Khao Manee is more frequently mentioned. Khao Manee cats are famed and there have been paintings found of them at temples. The white cat was originally known as the ‘Khao Plort’, then became known as the Khao Manee in the reign of King Chulalongkorn (1868-1910 AD).

The Khao Manee is not to be confused with the Siamese, or any Siamese relative including the Foreign White Siamese, which was bred from purebred Siamese with one white-coated British Shorthair ancestor. Though both white cats have a common background, the Siamese cat and the Khao Manee have different genetic structures, bloodlines and breeding policies, thus Khao Manee are considered a completely different breed in the West, as well as in its native home of Thailand.

Although the breed is well known in its native land, it has only recently been adopted by Western cat breeders, gaining "registration only" status from TICA in May 2009. On 3 September 2011, the breed was promoted to "Preliminary New Breed", effective from 1 May 2012 and on 30 August 2013 the breed was promoted to "Advanced New Breed", effective immediately.

Now the breed also gained "Miscellaneous" status in CFA from 2018 and was therefore accepted in other associations such as WCF.

Personality
They are devoted to their owners and are curious, intelligent cats who have an enduring sense of naughtiness. They are a quite inquisitive cat and love to play a good game of fetch before curling up with you for a warm nap. Known as the “White Gem”, the Khao Manee was rumored to be highly coveted by Thai royalty is thought to bring good luck to those fortunate enough to have one.

Breeding

The Khao Manee was said to be kept and bred initially by Siam royals, as was the case with other rare colored cats such as the Siamese. Breeders in Thailand are promoting and breeding the Khao Manee in the effort of preserving its lineage and breed standard. The first Khao Manee cat imported to the United States arrived in 1999 when Colleen Freymuth imported 12 Khao Manees. In 2004, she was joined by Frédéric Lachaud-Goedert in France who began another breeding program. With the help of Janet Poulsen, an edifying contributor to the establishment of the breed, they worked to have the breed recognized in all the world's cat registries. Breeders in the West are still working to promote and establish foundation lines for the Khao Manee.

The Khao Manees are currently probably the rarest feline breed in the world; the prices are relative high: an adult subject with gold eyes and "defects" ("broken" tail, strabismus, deafness, non-white subject ...) is negotiated around US $1,800. On the other hand, a young subject intended for breeding, coming directly from a prestigious breeding program in the West or Thailand, with odd eyes, and having beautiful characteristics, can be negotiated around US $3,500. Certain exceptional subjects with singular eye colors or with very rare features or healing talents can reach up to US $10,000.

In its country of origin, the Khao Manee is very popular because it is associated with the monarchy but also because several legends of extreme felicity and healing were reported by the press. It's always in relation with religious discovery and about sudden fortune. Some stories mention sums going up to 150 million Baht (over US $4 million) in 1993 for a subject with eyes like precious stones which funded the construction of a monastery.

A club joining western and eastern breeders, the Khao Manee Cat Club, has been formed in 2019 and was affiliated with the CFA in order to support the promotion, the preservation and the protection of the Khao Manees.

Finding a Pedigreed Khao Manee
After twelve weeks, kittens have had their basic inoculations and developed the physical and social stability needed for a new environment, showing, or being transported by air. Keeping such a rare treasure indoors, neutering or spaying, and providing acceptable surfaces (e.g. scratching posts) for the natural behavior of scratching are essential elements for maintaining a healthy, long, and joyful life.
There are a variety of breeders from where you may acquire your new kitten or cat, in Thailand or in the West now. Outside of Thailand, a registration of your kitten is mandatory with one major association to secure it is a real Khao Manee from imported ancestors. A potential buyer looking for a “pure bred” (pedigreed) Khao Manee as a pet can expect to pay over US $1500 depending on their eyes colors (around US $3000 for odd eyed kittens), their confirmation to the breed standard and your geographical location.

The Thai breeders used to breed only white to white Khao Manees. This is the most distinctive trait of the breed. While most western breeders perpetuate this heritage by screening their genetic informations, other breeders prefer to cross their subjects with colored Asian breeds of cats. This partly explains the significant variations between the prices among the different breeders. Their active investment in the preservation of the breed and their links with the preservation of Thai Khao Manees can also justify still the high cost of such precious creatures in the West. Some breeders will not hesitate to enter into a contract concerning the quality of the ceded Khao Manees and to give you guarantees of good health.

See also
Thai cat
Siamese cat
Suphalak cat
Korat cat
Burmese cat
Tonkinese cat

References

Further reading

 Martin R. Clutterbuck: Siamese Cats, Legends and Reality. White Lotus Press, Bangkok 2004,

External links
 The Khao Manee Cat Club
 the Khao Manee breed Profile 
 The Khao Manee Cat
 Khaodara European breeder website
 Odyssey Khao Manee
 Snowtrees breeder website
 Khao Manee pedigree database on Pawpeds
 Les Heures Bleues french breeder website
 / WhiteGemCattery Khao Manee

Cat breeds
Cat breeds originating in Thailand